Dragonsinger is a young adult science fiction novel by the American-Irish author Anne McCaffrey. Published by Atheneum Books in 1977, it was the fourth to appear in the Dragonriders of Pern series written by Anne McCaffrey and her son Todd McCaffrey.

As the sequel to Dragonsong, it was the second book in the Harper Hall of Pern trilogy, with a new publisher, editor, and target audience (young adults). The original Dragonriders of Pern trilogy was completed after publication of the first two Harper Hall books.

Plot summary
The novel follows Menolly, now apprenticed into the Harper Hall, a type of music conservatory for harpers (minstrels/educators) and other music professionals, as she begins her musical training to become a harper herself one day. The story begins within hours of the final events of Dragonsong, rounding out the tale of Menolly's coming of age.

Menolly arrives at Harper Hall to find herself the center of unwanted attention and conflict. As the Hall's first female apprentice, the Masters are divided on whether or not she is worth training, causing Menolly to be greeted with various degrees of ambivalence. Due to her gender, she is not allowed to share a dormitory with her fellow all-male apprentices and must be housed with the female students, none of whom are serious musicians and all of whom shun Menolly as an outsider. Conversely, because she dorms with the students, the apprentices reject her, claiming she is not truly one of them, and leaving Menolly confused as to her true place in Harper Hall.

In spite of these challenges, Menolly excels at all aspects of her apprenticeship while continuing to compose original tunes. She also becomes helpful to the Dragonriders by teaching them what she knows about fire-lizards, and presents Masterharper Robinton and his Journeyman Sebell with fire-lizards of their own. One night Menolly is woken by her frantic fire-lizards, who show her a terrifying vision of a Dragonrider and his dragon falling from the sky in flames. It is later revealed that the telepathic Dragons actually witnessed this event halfway across the world and transmitted the image to the fire-lizards, who in turn showed Menolly. The incident confirms suspicions that fire-lizards share a telepathic link with dragons and that they may have other undiscovered gifts. 

By the end of her first week, all the Masters agree that there is nothing they can teach Menolly, as she essentially completed her apprenticeship under her first Harper Petiron long before she came to Harper Hall. Much to her surprise, Menolly is promoted to Journeyman.

Awards
The American Library Association in 1999 cited the two early Pern trilogies (Dragonriders and Harper Hall), along with The Ship Who Sang, when McCaffrey received the annual Margaret A. Edwards Award for her "lifetime contribution in writing for teens".

Dragonsinger placed ninth for the annual Locus Award for Best Novel.

Notes

References

External links

1977 novels
1977 science fiction novels
Dragonriders of Pern books
Novels by Anne McCaffrey
Young adult fantasy novels
Atheneum Books books